David Svoboda (born 19 March 1985) is a Czech athlete who competes in the modern pentathlon. At the 2012 London Olympics Svoboda won the gold medal in the olympic pentathlon. At the 2008 Olympics Svoboda was 28th in the pentathlon.

David is the twin brother of professional triathlete Tomáš Svoboda.

References

External links
 
 
 

1985 births
Living people
Czech male modern pentathletes
Olympic modern pentathletes of the Czech Republic
Modern pentathletes at the 2008 Summer Olympics
Modern pentathletes at the 2012 Summer Olympics
Olympic medalists in modern pentathlon
Olympic gold medalists for the Czech Republic
Medalists at the 2012 Summer Olympics
World Modern Pentathlon Championships medalists
Sportspeople from Prague
Czech twins
Modern pentathletes at the 2016 Summer Olympics